Godwin Zaki is a Nigerian professional footballer, who plays as a forward.

Club career
He played for Enugu Rangers in the Nigeria Professional Football League. He previously played for clubs in Cyprus, Finland and Malta.

Personal life
He is the younger brother of John Zaki. He is known for his strength and physical presence with the ball.

References

Living people
Nigerian footballers
1994 births
Nigerian expatriate footballers
Lillestrøm SK players
Sunshine Stars F.C. players
Mqabba F.C. players
Delta Force F.C. players
Nigerian expatriate sportspeople in Cyprus
Nigerian expatriate sportspeople in Malta
Nigerian expatriate sportspeople in Finland
People from Benue State
Lobi Stars F.C. players
Association football forwards
Abia Warriors F.C. players